The Steve Prescott Man of Steel Awards is an end-of-season awards dinner for the Super League rugby league competition. The event's name is taken from the main award presented, the Man of Steel award for the rugby league footballer of the year. In 2014, it was renamed after Steve Prescott.

The Steve Prescott Man of Steel award

Origins
The awards were started in 1977 when David Howes, the Rugby League's public relations officer, organised sponsorship worth £3,000 from Trumanns Steel Limited for awards in six different categories; Trumanns Man of Steel, Division One Player of the Year, Division Two Player of the Year, Coach of the Year, Young Player of the Year and Referee of the Year.  The awards were voted on by the members of the rugby league press.
The first awards were made at the end of the 1976–77 season with the inaugural award winners being:
 Trumanns Man of Steel - David Ward, Leeds
 Division One Player of the Year - Malcolm Reilly, Castleford
 Division Two Player of the Year - Ged Marsh, Blackpool Borough
 Young Player of the Year - David Ward, Leeds
 Coach of the Year - Eric Ashton, St Helens
 Referee of the Year - Billy Thompson

In 2008, the voting for the award was changed, with the winner being chosen by the players of the Super League instead. In 2019, in response to criticism that some players were not taking the voting seriously, a panel of former rugby league players was chosen to determine the winner of the award. The voting was changed to a system similar to the Australian Dally M Medal, with points being awarded to the best performing players after each game (three points for the man of the match, two points for the runner-up, and one point for the third best player).

Name change
Former England player Steve Prescott died of cancer in 2013, aged 39. Following a short campaign, a petition with over 12,000 signatures was sent to the Rugby Football League, calling for the Man of Steel award to be renamed in Prescott's honour. In March 2014, the RFL officially announced that the award would be called the "Steve Prescott Man of Steel" from the 2014 season onwards.

Men of Steel

Multiple winners

Winners by club

Winners by country

Woman of Steel

In 2018 an additional category for the Woman of Steel from the Women's Super League was inaugurated.

Other Awards

Young Player of the Year

Coach of the Year

Top Try Scorer

Top Points Scorer

Top Metre Maker

Hit Man
The player making most tackles in the regular season.

Club of the Year

The Mike Gregory Spirit of Rugby League Award - Both players and non-players are eligible to receive the award, which will be judged by a panel from the governing body.
Fairplay Index Award for Super League
The Community Player of the year

Special awards

The ‘200 Club’ - retiring players who have played in over 200 games.

See also

Dally M Medal
Lance Todd Trophy
Harry Sunderland Trophy
Albert Goldthorpe Medal
Woman of Steel

References

External links
Man of Steel Award at rlhalloffame.org.uk

Rugby league trophies and awards
Super League